Seventh Street Bridge may refer to:

 Lion Bridge, Modesto, California
 Andy Warhol Bridge, Pittsburgh, Pennsylvania